Football Club Bascome Bermuda is a Bermudian football club based in Bermuda, that is set to play in the American USL League Two. The club was established 2005 and was scheduled to begin their first USL League Two season in 2020, before it was cancelled due to the COVID-19 pandemic. The club did not take part to the 2021 and 2022 seasons neither, due to ongoing travel restrictions between Bermuda and the USA.

History
On 22 January 2020, it was announced by USL League Two, the American semi-professional soccer league, that Bascome Bermuda would be joining the competition for the 2020 season. The club was entered into USL League Two with the idea of providing a platform for young Bermudian footballers to eventually make it professionally. The club was entered into the league's Mid Atlantic Division for 2020. In joining the league, Bascome Bermuda became the first club to participate in the United Soccer League's from Bermuda since Bermuda Hogges played in the league in 2012. However, their debut has been delayed, as the 2020 season was cancelled due to the COVID-19 pandemic and then the club opted out of the 2021 season, due to continued travel restrictions from the pandemic. The club did not take part to the 2022 season neither.

Ownership
The club is jointly owned by former Bermudian international Andrew Bascome and Henrick Schroder.

Coaching staff

Statistics and records

Season-by-season

Head Coaches record

See also
 Bermuda Hogges
 Football in Bermuda
 Bermuda national football team
 USL League Two

References

External links

 

Football clubs in Bermuda
Association football clubs established in 2005
Expatriated football clubs
USL League Two teams